Mark Simpson may refer to:

 Mark Simpson (basketball) (born 1961), American basketball player
 Mark Simpson (soccer) (born 1966), American soccer player
 Mark Simpson (clarinetist) (born 1988), winner of the BBC Young Musician of the Year, 2006
 Mark Simpson (comics), British comic artist under the pseudonym "Jock"
 Mark Simpson (Ireland correspondent), journalist and BBC Ireland correspondent
 Mark Simpson (journalist), British journalist and broadcaster